Xinhua County is a county and the 4th most populous county-level division in the Province of Hunan, China; it is under the administration of Loudi City.

Located along the middle reaches of the Zi River, it covers 3,635 square kilometers and has a population of 1,291,626 (2002). Xinhua shares the border with Lengshuijiang, Lianyuan, Xinshao, Xupu and Longhui counties and cities. As a county, it was founded at 1072 (Northern Song Dynasty) and now it is under jurisdiction of the Loudi City and subdivided into 7 townships and 19 towns, Shangmei  is the county seat.

The economy of Xinhua County is primarily agricultural, with 1.16 million of Xinhua County's population of 1.28 million working in agriculture. Other than agriculture, industries include machinery, electronics, ceramics, building materials, metallurgy, coal, chemical, food, paper, bamboo and wood processing. In recent years, Xinhua County's economy has grown quite a lot.

In 2011, media attention was attracted by a construction project started by the county's government. In the hope of attracting tourists, the officials wanted to build a lavish temple (Xiongshan Si - ), diverting funds from more essential projects.

Climate

Notable people
He Jiankui, the key figure in the genetically-edited human embryo He Jiankui affair was born here.

References

External links 

 
County-level divisions of Hunan